Theodoros Apostolidis (born 26 September 1952) is a former Greek football defender.

Career
Born in Kavala, he started playing in Yugoslavia with youth team of FK Bor, newly promoted team to the Yugoslav First League in 1969. At start of 1970–71 season he was loaned to satellite club FK Mladost Bor. He later returned to Greece and played with Kastoria F.C. between 1975 and 1978. Then, during summer 1978, he signed with another Superleague Greece club, PAOK Thessaloniki, where he played 6 seasons till 1984. He became one of the legendary players of PAOK with 115 league appearances.

References

1952 births
Living people
Footballers from Kavala
Greek footballers
Association football defenders
Kavala F.C. players
PAOK FC players
Super League Greece players
FK Bor players
Greek expatriate footballers
Expatriate footballers in Yugoslavia